Chalcidinae is a subfamily of chalcidid wasps in the family Chalcididae. There are about 6 genera and 17 described species in Chalcidinae.

Genera
These six genera belong to the subfamily Chalcidinae:
 Acanthochalcis Cameron, 1884 c g b
 Brachymeria Westwood, 1829 c g b
 Chalcis Fabricius, 1787 c g b
 Conura Spinola, 1837 i c g b
 Phasgonophora Westwood, 1832 c g b
 Trigonura Sichel, 1866 c g b
Data sources: i = ITIS, c = Catalogue of Life, g = GBIF, b = Bugguide.net

References

 Andrade de, T.V. & M.T. Tavares 2009: Revision of Ceyxia Girault, stat. rev. (Hymenoptera, Chalcididae, Brachymeriini). Revista Brasileira de Entomologia 53 (4): 511-548

External links 
 

Chalcidoidea
Apocrita subfamilies